The 2006 Harvard Crimson football team represented Harvard University in the 2006 NCAA Division I FCS football season.  Harvard finished the season with an overall record of 7–3, placing third among Ivy league teams with a conference mark of 4–3.

Schedule

References

Harvard
Harvard Crimson football seasons
Harvard Crimson football
Harvard Crimson football